Aleksandra Sergeyevna Troitskaya (1896–1979) was a Soviet microbiologist-leprologist, candidate of medical sciences. Author of cancer vaccine. Honorary Citizen of Kaluga (1996).

Biography
Troitskaya was born in Bryankovo (now in  Suvorovsky District of  Tula Oblast), grew up in  Kaluga.

In 1917 she graduated from the Kaluga Diocesan School (she also studied with Konstantin Tsiolkovsky). In  1920s she worked as a teacher.

In 1934 she graduated from Kharkiv National Medical University. In 1940-1951   a microbiologist, from 1946   Senior Researcher of the Astrakhan Leprosarium.

In 1946, at the Kazan Federal University, she defended her thesis on pain biotherapy in the treatment of leprosy.

Since 1951 (after retirement) she worked as a microbiologist in the laboratory of the Kaluga Oncologic Dispensary.

She discovered new strains of corynebacteria — Corynebacterium Krestovnikova / Troitskaya.

Died
Troitskaya died in 1979. Buried on Pyatnitskoye Cemetery in Kaluga.

References

Bibliography
 Village News (1974)   
 Mikhail Gavrilov. The Adventures of Capricorn (2017)   
 Evgeny Dobrenko. Late Stalinism: The Aesthetics of Politics (2020)

External links
 Как уничтожали вакцину против рака 
 Regresi lengkap selama sepuluh tahun dalam penyebaran barah paru-paru sel kecil dengan penglibatan sistem saraf pusat selepas rawatan gabungan  (in Malay)

1896 births
1979 deaths
People from Suvorovsky District
People from Likhvinsky Uyezd
Russian leprologists
Russian bacteriologists
Soviet bacteriologists
Soviet women physicians
Kazan Federal University alumni
Kharkiv National Medical University people